Kadeen Corbin (born 27 November 1991) is an English netball player. She was part of the England squad that won gold at the 2018 Commonwealth Games and plays in the Superleague for Hertfordshire Maverics.

Corbin was awarded her 50th cap for England in November 2017.

References

External links
 

1991 births
Living people
English netball players
Sportspeople from London
Netball players at the 2018 Commonwealth Games
Commonwealth Games gold medallists for England
Commonwealth Games medallists in netball
Mavericks netball players
Team Bath netball players
New South Wales state netball league players
English expatriate netball people in New Zealand
English expatriate netball people in Australia
Mainland Tactix players
Medallists at the 2018 Commonwealth Games